Supertest may refer to:
 In World Series Cricket, a series of unofficial Test matches in 1977 and 1978
 In the 2005 ICC Super Series, a one-off Test match
 Supertest Petroleum, a Canadian oil and gas company